Thomas Stephen Chalmers (26 December 1935 – 29 April 2019) was a Scottish footballer who played as a centre-forward and spent the majority of his career with Celtic. He is the club's fifth-highest goalscorer with 236 goals and is considered one of their greatest players. He is particularly known for scoring the winning goal in the 1967 European Cup Final against Inter Milan. Chalmers later played for Morton and Partick Thistle. He also represented Scotland five times in international matches.

Early life
Chalmers was born on 26 December 1935 in the Garngad district of Glasgow, where he attended St Roch's Secondary School. The family later moved to nearby Balornock. His father, David, played for Clydebank.

Career
Leaving school at age of 14, he signed for Kirkintilloch Rob Roy in 1953. Subsequently, he joined the RAF and during his time doing national service at RAF Stradishall in 1955 played for Newmarket Town. He then moved back to Scotland, signing with SJFA team Ashfield, and represented Scotland at that level in 1959. Shortly afterwards he signed for Celtic, making his league debut in March 1959 against Airdrie.

He spent 12 full seasons with Celtic, helping the club to six league titles, three Scottish Cups, and four League Cups, as well as being part of the Lisbon Lions side that won the 1967 European Cup. He scored the winning goal in the 85th minute of the final.

His involvement became limited after he broke a leg in the 1969 Scottish League Cup Final, and he missed the rest of that season including the 1970 European Cup Final. His total of 236 goals is the fifth-highest in the history of the club, and he is remembered as one of the greatest players in Celtic's history.

After leaving Celtic Park in September 1971 at the age of 35, Chalmers continued to appear in Scotland's top tier, with spells at Morton and Partick Thistle before he retired in 1975. He made a very brief comeback with junior club St Roch's during the 1975–76 season.

He was inducted into the Scottish Football Hall of Fame in 2016.

International
Chalmers won five full caps for Scotland between 1964 and 1966, scoring three goals. He was also selected four times for the Scottish Football League XI.

Personal life
Chalmers's father David played for Clydebank in the 1920s, and his son, Paul, also played professionally with several clubs after starting his career with Celtic in the 1980s. Chalmers and his wife, Sadie, had six children.

In 1955, he was diagnosed with tuberculosis meningitis and was given only weeks to live before being successfully treated.

It was reported in May 2017 that 81-year-old Chalmers was suffering from dementia and was unable to attend the Lisbon Lions' 50th anniversary events. Chalmers died on 29 April 2019, aged 83.

Career statistics

Club

International appearances

International goals
Scores and results list Scotland's goal tally first.

Honours
Celtic
 European Cup: 1966–67
 Intercontinental Cup runners-up: 1967
 Scottish League Championship (4): 1965–66, 1966–67, 1967–68, 1968–69
 Scottish Cup (3): 1964–65, 1966–67, 1968–69
 Scottish League Cup (4): 1966–67, 1967–68, 1968–69, 1969–70
 Glasgow Cup (4): 1961–62, 1963–64, 1964–65, 1966–67

Scotland
 Home Championship: 1966–67

Notes

References

External links
 Player profile at The Celtic Wiki
 Player profile at The Partick Thistle History Archive

1935 births
Ashfield F.C. players
Association football forwards
Celtic F.C. players
Dumbarton F.C. players
Greenock Morton F.C. players
Kirkintilloch Rob Roy F.C. players
Scottish Junior Football Association players
Scotland junior international footballers
2019 deaths
Newmarket Town F.C. players
Partick Thistle F.C. players
Scotland international footballers
Scottish Football League players
Scottish Football League representative players
Scottish footballers
Scottish league football top scorers
Scottish Roman Catholics
Footballers from Glasgow
St Roch's F.C. players
Scottish Football Hall of Fame inductees
UEFA Champions League winning players
People from Springburn
Deaths from dementia in the United Kingdom